The NRF League One is a New Zealand amateur football league. The league is run by Northern Region Football, an amalgamation of the Auckland Football Federation and Northern Football Federation, and includes football clubs located in Northland and Auckland. It comprises half of the fifth tier of football in the northern North Island, alongside the WaiBOP Premiership. Up until 2022, the competition was known as NRF Championship.

The fixtures are played generally from April to September. The league winners are promoted to the NRFL Northern Confernce. Until 2022 the second-place team entered a two-game playoff series with the champions of the WaiBOP Premiership (now WaiBOP League One), with the winner being promoted.

Teams can be relegated from this division, however only one team representing each club can progress into this division and beyond. If teams do not meet the criteria to gain promotion to the NRF Championship, no teams are relegated from this division. 

The current champions of the 2022 season are Central United, who as a result will be promoted to the 2023 NRFL Division 2. Papatoetoe will play off against the WaiBOP Premiership champions, Waikato Unicol for the other promotion spot.

Current Northern League structure
 Northern League
 NRFL Championship 
 NRFL Northern Conference, NRFL Southern Conference
 NRF League One, WaiBOP League One
 NRF Championship Division 1

Current clubs
As of 2023 season.

References

External links
Lotto NRFL website
Auckland Football Federation

4